Vullnet Emini (Macedonian: Вулнет Емини; born 10 September 1978) is a retired ethnic Albanian footballer from North Macedonia who was last played for FC Gossau in Switzerland. He has twice represented the Macedonia national football team.

International career 
He made his senior debut for Macedonia in a November 2005 friendly match against Paraguay and has earned a total of 3 caps, scoring no goals. His final international was a June 2006 friendly against Turkey.

References

External sources
 
 Profile at MacedonianFootball
 German career stats - FuPa

1978 births
Living people
Sportspeople from Tetovo
Albanian footballers from North Macedonia
Association football midfielders
Macedonian footballers
North Macedonia international footballers
VfR Aalen players
KF Shkëndija players
FK Renova players
FC Gossau players
Macedonian First Football League players
Macedonian expatriate footballers
Expatriate footballers in Germany
Macedonian expatriate sportspeople in Germany
Expatriate footballers in Switzerland
Macedonian expatriate sportspeople in Switzerland